Kenneth R. Rutherford is co-founder of the Landmine Survivors Network and a researcher in the field of political science.

International work
While studying political science at the University of Colorado in the mid-1980s, Rutherford decided to work in international development. Since graduating in 1985, he has worked for international aid agencies in Bosnia, Kenya, Mauritania, Senegal and Somalia, and was a Fulbright Scholar in Jordan.

Rutherford began his international career as a Peace Corps volunteer in Mauritania (1987–1989). During this period he was contracted by the United Nations High Commissioner for Refugees to assist in refugee camps on the border between Mauritania and Senegal.

He returned to the US to earn his MBA at the University of Colorado, then in 1993 went to work for the International Rescue Committee in Kenya and Somalia, where he was injured by a landmine.

Together with Jerry White he co-founded Landmine Survivors Network in 1995 which later became Survivor Corps. He and White accompanied Princess Diana on her last humanitarian mission to visit landmine survivors in Bosnia-Herzegovina in August 1997, only three weeks before her death. Rutherford was a prominent leader in the International Campaign to Ban Landmines which won the 1997 Nobel Peace Prize. In 2000, he earned his doctorate in Political Science from Georgetown University.

He was Associate Professor of Political Science at Missouri State University from 2002 until 2010. In 2005, Rutherford went to Jordan on a Fulbright Fellowship where he taught international politics at the University of Jordan in Amman.

In 2008 Rutherford played a key role in the drafting of the Convention on the Rights of Persons with Disabilities and the Convention on Cluster Munitions. He was a board member of Survivor Corps until it closed in September 2010.

In February 2010, Rutherford became Director of the Center for International Stabilization and Recovery (CISR), which includes the Mine Action Information Center, at James Madison University. In his capacity as CISR Director, he oversees and participates in post-conflict missions and projects in numerous countries worldwide, including Burundi, Iraq, Tajikistan and Vietnam.

He currently serves on the board of directors of Legacies of War, Friendship Industries, the Shenandoah Valley Civil War Roundtable and the Shenandoah Valley Battlefield Foundation.

Landmine accident
On December 16, 1993, while working for the International Rescue Committee in Somalia, Rutherford's vehicle struck a landmine, injuring him severely. After a medical evacuation during which he nearly bled to death, one leg was amputated to save his life and the second one amputated several years later. He has since spoken to the United States Congress against landmines. "It was an experience that fundamentally altered my life for the good," Rutherford said. "It crystallized my vision of what I believe I was put on this Earth to do."

Publications

Articles
Ken Rutherford has published more than 40 articles in numerous academic and policy journals, including the Journal of International Law and Policy, World Politics, Journal of International Politics, International Journal of World Peace, Alternatives, Non-Proliferation Review, Harvard International Review, The Journal of ERW and Mine Action, Journal of Transnational Associations, Pain Medicine, International Journal on Grey Literature, and Security Dialogue. He has contributed book reviews to Armed Forces and Society, and National Security Studies Journal.

Books
Rutherford is the author of Humanitarianism Under Fire: The US and UN Intervention in Somalia, (2008) and Disarming States: The International Movement to Ban Landmines (2011). He has co-edited two books: Reframing the Agenda: The Impact of NGO and Middle Power Cooperation in International Security Policy (2003) and Landmines and Human Security: International Politics and War's Hidden Legacy (2004).

Book chapters and contributions

Rutherford has contributed chapters to Negotiating Sovereignty and Human Rights, Global Society in Transition: An International Politics Reader, Civil Society in the Information Age, The Landmine Action Smart Book, Primary Care of Landmine Injuries in Africa: A Basic Text for Health Workers, Landmine Monitor Report 2000, and To Walk Without Fear: The Global Movement to Ban Landmines. Rutherford also contributed to the chapter on Bosnia-Herzegovina in the 1998 Report for Special Operations and Low Intensity Conflict Office.

Awards, honors and public appearances
The organization he was associated with, International Campaign to Ban Landmines, shared the 1997 Nobel Peace Prize.  Rutherford was co-recipient of the 1999 Leadership in International Rehabilitation Award presented by the Center for International Rehabilitation and has been inducted into the University of Colorado Heritage Center's "Hall of Excellence," a permanent exhibit at the University of Colorado. He has received the Marshall Legacy Institute's 2005 Survivors' Assistance Award, the 2002 United Airlines Everyday Hero Award, and the 2002 Adopt-A-Minefield Humanitarian Award, presented by Paul McCartney and Lady Heather Mills. Rutherford is also the 2013–2014 recipient of the Human Security Award from the Center for Unconventional Security Affairs (CUSA) at the University of California-Irvine.

As an advocate for people with disabilities affected by landmines, he has presented in more than 30 countries, testifying before U.S. Congress and the U.N. (New York City and Geneva). He has also appeared on Dateline, Nightline, The View and National Public Radio's Morning Edition and All Things Considered. His personal story of recovering from his accident to pursue his dreams of marrying his fiancée, having children and becoming a professor has been profiled by The Oprah Winfrey Show, Reader's Digest and the BBC.

In June 2013, he was included among the "one hundred most influential people in armed violence reduction" by the London-based organization Action on Armed Violence.

References

External links
 Center for International Stabilization and Recovery at James Madison University
 Ken Rutherford, "Landmines: A Survivor’s Tale" - Journal of Mine Action
 Landmine Survivor Leads JMU Center for International Stabilization
 A CU EMBA Alum And His Worldwide Crusade
 "Panel: U.S. Still Reviewing Ban on Landmines." Ken Rutherford took part in a panel discussion sponsored by the Georgetown School of Continuing Studies and co-sponsored by the United States Campaign to Ban Landmines, Georgetown University Department of Government, Lecture Fund of Georgetown University, Georgetown University Mortara Center for International Studies and the Georgetown Public Policy Institute on March 3, 2011.
 "Victim Assistance Intervention: Survivor Voice and Victim Assistance in the Convention on Cluster Munitions," by Ken Rutherford, presented at the South East Asia Regional Conference on the Convention on Cluster Munitions, October 20, 2008, Xiengkhuang, Lao PDR.

American amputees
American anti-war activists
American human rights activists
American humanitarians
American political scientists
Landmine victims
Living people
Mine action
Georgetown University alumni
Peace Corps volunteers
University of Colorado alumni
Academic staff of the University of Jordan
James Madison University people
Scientists with disabilities
Disability rights activists
Year of birth missing (living people)